Francisco Romano Guillemín (1884–1950) was a Mexican artist born in Tlapa, Guerrero. He is considered to be one of the few Mexican Impressionists. He started his art studies in Puebla and then continued at the Academia de San Carlos under the direction of Antonio Fabres, German Gedovius and Leandro Izaguirre. He was a fellow student of the famous muralist Diego Rivera. His great influence was Impressionism which he discovered during a trip to Europe. Seurat and his pointillism style played a major role in his formation as an artist. Upon his return to Mexico he became a professor at the Escuela de Bellas Artes. Francisco Romano Guillemin died in Cuautla, Morelos in 1950.

Gallery

References

Artspawn. "Biography of Francisco Romano Guillemin", Biographical information about Francisco Romano Guillemin at Artspawn.

20th-century Mexican painters
Mexican male painters
Mexican Impressionist painters
1884 births
1950 deaths
Mexican people of Italian descent
Mexican people of French descent
Artists from Guerrero
20th-century Mexican male artists